Mohamed Hegazi (born 13 September 1961) is an Egyptian boxer. He competed at the 1984 Summer Olympics and the 1988 Summer Olympics.

References

1961 births
Living people
Egyptian male boxers
Olympic boxers of Egypt
Boxers at the 1984 Summer Olympics
Boxers at the 1988 Summer Olympics
Place of birth missing (living people)
Featherweight boxers
20th-century Egyptian people